Mrinal Thakur is a professor in the Department of Mechanical Engineering of Auburn University in Alabama, USA. He holds a series of patents on electrically conductive polymers. Thakur claims that the 2000 Nobel Prize in chemistry to Alan J. Heeger, Alan MacDiarmid and Hideki Shirakawa was awarded for a scientific result he disproved in 1988: that only conjugated polymers could conduct electricity.

Awards 

Thakur was nominated for the Nobel Prize in Chemistry in 2002. He holds M.S. and Ph.D. degrees from Case Western Reserve University and a BS in Physics from Visva-Bharati University.

Publications of Mrinal Thakur 

Patents of Mrinal Thakur

References 

Indian emigrants to the United States
Case Western Reserve University alumni
Auburn University faculty
Living people
Year of birth missing (living people)